A constitutional referendum was held in Denmark on 6 September 1920. It was held in order to make changes to the constitution of Denmark from 1915 that had been made necessary to facilitate the reunification of Southern Jutland into the kingdom of Denmark. The changes were approved by 96.9% of voters, with a 49.6% turnout. A total of 614,227 of the 1,291,745 registered voters voted in favour, meaning that 47.6% of eligible voters had voted for the proposals, above the 45% required by the constitution.

Results

References

Referendums in Denmark
1920 referendums
Constitutional referendum
20th century in Danish law
Denmark
Constitutional referendums
September 1920 events